Elijah Sherman Farm is a historic tobacco farm complex and national historic district located near Berea, Granville County, North Carolina.  The farmhouse was built about 1887, and is a two-story, three bay, frame I-house, with a one-story full facade porch.  Also on the property are two log corn cribs, stone well, two garage/sheds, a privy, smokehouse, woodhouse, corn crib, washhouse, stable, packhouse, striphouse, four tobacco barns, and a family cemetery.

It was listed on the National Register of Historic Places in 1988.

References

Tobacco buildings in the United States
Farms on the National Register of Historic Places in North Carolina
Historic districts on the National Register of Historic Places in North Carolina
Houses completed in 1887
Houses in Granville County, North Carolina
National Register of Historic Places in Granville County, North Carolina